Eagle Lake is in Blue Earth County, Minnesota, United States. The population was 3,278 at the 2020 census. It is part of the Mankato-North Mankato Metropolitan Statistical Area.

U.S. Route 14 and Minnesota State Highway 60 are two of the main arterial routes in the community.

History
A post office was established in the area in 1870 and the village created was named Spier. It wasn't until 1873 the name was changes to Eagle Lake. The townsite was platted in 1872. It was named after nearby Eagle Lake. A post office has been in operation in Eagle Lake since 1873.

Geography

Demographics

2010 census
As of the census of 2010, there were 2,422 people, 887 households, and 650 families living in the city. The racial makeup of the city was 95.5% White, 1.4% African American, 0.3% Native American, 0.8% Asian, 0.6% from other races, and 1.5% from two or more races. Hispanic or Latino of any race were 2.8% of the population.

There were 887 households, of which 41.4% had children under the age of 18 living with them, 59.5% were married couples living together, 8.1% had a female householder with no husband present, 5.6% had a male householder with no wife present, and 26.7% were non-families. 18.9% of all households were made up of individuals, and 3.2% had someone living alone who was 65 or older. The average household size was 2.73 and the average family size was 3.13.

The median age in the city was 31.7. 28.7% of residents were under 18; 8.5% were between the ages of 18 and 24; 32.4% were from 25 to 44; 23.7% were from 45 to 64; and 6.6% were 65 or older. The gender makeup of the city was 50.5% male and 49.5% female.

2000 census
As of the 2000 census, there were 1,787 people, 651 households, and 481 families living in the city. The racial makeup of the city was 96.98% White, 0.67% African American, 0.22% Native American, 0.56% Asian, 0.50% from other races, and 1.06% from two or more races. Hispanic or Latino of any race were 1.40% of the population.

There were 651 households, of which 45.9% had children under 18 living with them, 58.1% were married couples living together, 11.5% had a female householder with no husband present, and 26.0% were non-families. 19.4% of all households were made up of individuals, and 3.2% had someone living alone who was 65 or older. The average household size was 2.75 and the average family size was 3.17.

In the city, the population was spread out, with 31.8% under 18, 9.6% from 18 to 24, 35.1% from 25 to 44, 19.0% from 45 to 64, and 4.5% who were 65 or older. The median age was 30. For every 100 females, there were 104.7 males. For every 100 females 18 and over, there were 96.6 males.

The median income for a household in the city was $46,413, and the median income for a family was $54,167. Males had a median income of $33,313 versus $23,520 for females. The per capita income was $17,574. About 5.1% of families and 6.9% of the population were below the poverty line, including 7.1% of those under 18 and 7.7% of those 65 or older.

Eagle Lake Tator Days
Every third weekend of July, Eagle Lake celebrates Tator Days. Events usually include a Miss Eagle Lake queen coronation on Thursday, a grand parade Saturday afternoon and a fundraising breakfast Sunday morning. The American Legion gives free french fries to those sporting Tator Days raffle buttons.

References

Cities in Blue Earth County, Minnesota
Cities in Minnesota
Mankato – North Mankato metropolitan area
1872 establishments in Minnesota